Sandra Ambrosio Monica (born 10 April 1963) is an Argentine former cyclist. She competed in the women's cross-country mountain biking event at the 1996 Summer Olympics.

References

External links
 

1963 births
Living people
Argentine female cyclists
Olympic cyclists of Argentina
Cyclists at the 1996 Summer Olympics
Place of birth missing (living people)
20th-century Argentine women